Grindstone Creek may refer to:

Canada
Ontario
Grindstone Creek (Algoma District), a tributary of the Mississagi River
Grindstone Creek (Hamilton Harbour), a tributary of Lake Ontario in the Greater Toronto and Hamilton Area

United States
Missouri
Grindstone Creek (Grand River)
Grindstone Creek (Hinkson Creek)
Grindstone Creek (South Dakota)